Jessica Lee Waterhouse (born 7 February 1997) is a former Australian professional footballer (soccer), who played for Adelaide United in the Australian W-League. She played there for three seasons.

In 2017, Waterhouse shifted to Australian Rules Football, signing with the Christies Beach Football Club in the Adelaide Footy League competition, and played in the Division 2 Premiership team that season.

References

1997 births
Living people
Australian women's soccer players
Adelaide United FC (A-League Women) players
A-League Women players
Christies Beach Football Club players
Women's association football midfielders
Adelaide Football Club (AFLW) players
Australian rules footballers from South Australia